Munther Abdullah  is a UAE football midfielder who played for the United Arab Emirates in the 1996 Asian Cup. He also played for Al Wasl FC.

External links

1975 births
Living people
Emirati footballers
United Arab Emirates international footballers
1996 AFC Asian Cup players
1997 FIFA Confederations Cup players
Al-Wasl F.C. players
UAE Pro League players
Association football midfielders
Footballers at the 1994 Asian Games
Asian Games competitors for the United Arab Emirates